The Monmouth Courthouse Commercial Historic District is a historic district located in downtown Monmouth, Illinois. The district encompasses Monmouth's historic commercial core and includes 63 contributing buildings and sites, most of them commercial buildings. Growth in the district began in the 1850s and continued through the 1920s, with occasional spurts in between due to rebuilding after fires. The Public Square, a small park within a roundabout, serves as the anchor of the district; the Warren County Courthouse, a Richardsonian Romanesque building completed in 1895, is its namesake building. Most of the commercial buildings within the district have Italianate or Commercial Style designs, with the former style generally predating the latter. Examples of the Queen Anne, Classical Revival, Art Deco, and Moderne styles can also be seen in the district.

The district was added to the National Register of Historic Places on February 1, 2006.

References

Italianate architecture in Illinois
Queen Anne architecture in Illinois
Romanesque Revival architecture in Illinois
Neoclassical architecture in Illinois
Commercial architecture in Illinois
Art Deco architecture in Illinois
Moderne architecture in Illinois
Buildings and structures completed in 1871
Buildings and structures in Warren County, Illinois
1871 establishments in Illinois
Historic districts on the National Register of Historic Places in Illinois
Chicago school architecture in Illinois